Dedeoğlu can refer to:

 Dedeoğlu, Devrek
 Dedeoğlu, Kemah